The Prior of Restenneth (later Commendator of Restenneth) was the head of the Augustinian canons of Restenneth Priory, Angus. The following is a list of priors and commendators:

List of priors

 Robert, 1147x1159-1162
 William, 1178- 1189x1194
 Hugh, 1198-1205
 Berengar, 1206
 John, 1219x1238
 Germanus, 1218 x, 1224 x
 William, 1267
 A[???], x1292
 Robert, 1296
 William, 1317x1321
 Bernard, 1320
 John de Eskdale, 1324 x 1327-1330
 Alexander de Falkirk, 1347-1369
 John Marsyale, 1388
 Thomas de Eskdale, 1408
 James de Keith, 1411-1419
 John Hunter, 1430
 Nicholas Crawford, 1445 xc. 1464
 James Dunmain (Dunmanning),  c.1464 - 1470
 Henry Barrie, 1465 -1466
 John Woodman, 1465 x 1468
 William Lindsay, 1470 -1471 x 1476
 William Forfar, 1474
 William Rutherford, 1484 -1494
 Thomas Kinnear, 1490 -1492
 Alexander Farnese, 1494
 David Guthrie, 1494
 Alexander Menteith, 1494-1516
 Thomas Nudre, 1513-1523
 John Hovinan (Home), 1523-1547
 David Douglas, 1530 -1533
 Robert Cottis, 1531-1534

List of commendators

 Andrew Home, 1547-1593

Notes

Bibliography
 Cowan, Ian B. & Easson, David E., Medieval Religious Houses: Scotland With an Appendix on the Houses in the Isle of Man, Second Edition, (London, 1976), p. 95-6
 Watt, D.E.R. & Shead, N.F. (eds.), The Heads of Religious Houses in Scotland from the 12th to the 16th Centuries, The Scottish Records Society, New Series, Volume 24, (Edinburgh, 2001), pp. 182–86

See also
 Restenneth Priory

Restenneth
Restenneth
Restenneth